Colonia del Sacramento is a city in southwestern Uruguay, by the Río de la Plata, facing Buenos Aires, Argentina. It is one of the oldest towns in Uruguay and capital of the Colonia Department. It has a population of around 27,000.

Its historic quarter is a UNESCO World Heritage Site. Modern Colonia del Sacramento produces textiles and has a free trade zone, in addition to a polytechnic centre and various government buildings.

History

Following the restoration of the Portuguese crown, King Peter II sought the resolution of the southern border of Brazil. Manuel Lobo with 5 ships containing about 400 soldiers, craftsmen, carpenters and stonecutters, and 18 guns, reached San Gabriel Island on 20 January 1680.  On 28 January, they commenced establishing a post.

José de Garro sent spies from Santo Domingo de Soriano on 22 February 1680, after receiving a negative response on 10 February to his ultimatum to leave the site.  Garro sent a force of 3,400 men under the command of Antonio de Vera Mujica, capturing the besieged town on the night of 6-7 August 1680.  Lobo was taken as a prisoner to Buenos Aires, where he died on 7 January 1683.  A treaty between Spain and Portugal signed in 1681 returned Colonia to Portugal. 

Field Marshal Duarte Teixeira Chaves arrived off the San Gabriel islands on 25 January 1683, and commenced to rebuild the settlement.  Field Marshal Cristóvão Dornelas Abreu was its governor until 1690, when Dom Francisco Naper de Lencastre took over.  Smuggling, and cattle hunting from the Banda Oriental, were the main components of the colony's economy. Lencastre ordered the building of houses of stone and mud with tile roofs, the enlargement of the city walls, and the addition of a fortified tower. The colonists grew wheat, hemp flax, and grape vines, exported cattle hides to Rio de Janeiro, while importing wood and foodstuffs.  Sebastião da Veiga Cabral took over as governor in 1699.

As a consequence of the War of the Spanish Succession, the governor of Buenos Aires, Valdes Incian, initiated the Siege of Colonia del Sacramento. The forces of the Spanish governor were commanded by Baltazar Garc%C3%ADa Ros from 18 October 1704 until 14 March 1705, when the colonists were evacuated by Portuguese ships.  Only the churches and bridge remained undestroyed.

The colony was given back to Portugal in the Treaty of Utrecht. Manuel Gomes Barbosa took possession on 10 February 1718 with 1,040 colonists.  More colonists arrived in 1721. Antonio Pedro de Vasconcellos took over as governor on 14 March 1722 and transformed it into the richest and best defended city in the Rio de la Plata region.  This included the coastal bastions of São Pedro de Alcântara, São Miguel, Santo António, São João, Carmo, and Santa Rita. 

Another attack during the Spanish–Portuguese War (1735–1737), failed. Don Luis Garcia de Bivar took over as governor in 1749, but died on 5 March 1760.  During that time, the Treaty of Madrid (13 January 1750) was never complied with and finally considered null and void. Brigadier Vicente da Silva da Fonseca then took over as governor.  Fonseca was forced to surrender the colony to Pedro Antonio de Cevallos on 11 October 1762.  Spain returned the colony in the 1762 Treaty of Fontainebleau, and Dom José Pedro de Figueiredo Sarmento took over as governor on 27 December 1763. He was replaced by Francisco José da Rocha on 15 March 1777.
 
With the Treaty of San Ildefonso in 1777, the colony became a Spanish possession once more. 

It then transferred to Portuguese control again, being later incorporated into Brazil after 1816, when the entire Banda Oriental (Uruguay) was seized by the government of the United Kingdom of Portugal, Brazil and the Algarves and renamed the Cisplatina province.

On 10 January 1809, before the independence of Uruguay, it was designated as a "Vila" ("town" in 19th century Portuguese) and has since been elevated to the status of "Ciudad" ("city" in Spanish).
 
Since independence, Colonia del Sacramento has expanded to the north and east, but the original Bairro Histórico (historic quarter in Portuguese or Barrio Histórico, current Spanish spelling) retains its irregular, terrain-fitting street plan built by the Portuguese, contrasting with the wider, orthogonal calles in the newer Spanish area.

In 2022, It was confirmed Colonia was going to make a Silicon Valley in Colonia called 'Colonia Ala Este' to bring more Argentine immigrants due to the bad economy in Argentina doubling their population making their goal reach to about 60,000 people in total in Colonia. With an initial investment of more than US$ 100 million, it was planned to build a sustainable city open to the community to generate a hub for the knowledge economy industry on a 500-hectare site, which includes forests and seven kilometers of coastline. with beaches such as Calabrés and Fernando.

Timeline of rule
The rule from 1680 to present (with flag of the period) is:

Population
In 2011 Colonia del Sacramento had a population of 26,231.
 
Source: Instituto Nacional de Estadística de Uruguay

Geography

Climate
Colonia del Sacramento has a mild humid subtropical climate, described by the Köppen climate classification as Cfa. Summers are warm and winters are cool, with relatively frequent frosts and fog. The precipitation is evenly distributed throughout the year, with an average of 1,039 mm (40.91 in), and the annual average temperature is 17 °C (63 °F).

Urban fabric
The city was developed on a peninsula that protrudes into the Río de la Plata. The 16 hectare "Barrio Histórico", or Portuguese Old City, was enclosed by a fortification wall across the peninsula in the site of present-day Calle Ituzaingó. Most of the fortification wall was removed in 1777 and some remaining parts again in 1859. The Portuguese part of the city has an irregular street network.

Outside the wall, the historical part of the city was planned in Spanish colonial style and in the characteristic checkerboard layout.

Sport
The local professional football team is Plaza Colonia, founded in 1917, playing at the Estadio Profesor Alberto Suppici.

They won the 2016 Clausura, their biggest success to date.

Deportivo Colonia founded in 1999 lost its professional status in 2007. They play at the Estadio Miguel Campomar.

Club Atlético Plaza has futsal, volleyball and basketball sections, as well as a football section based at Estadio Néstor Naviliat.

The town's Plaza de toros Real de San Carlos is a disused bullring which has been renovated and repurposed as a performing arts venue.

Points of interest
The Barrio Histórico (historic quarter) section of Colonia del Sacramento is designated a World Heritage Site by UNESCO. It has some cobblestone streets built by the Portuguese in the 17th century, and is within walking distance of the town's ferry terminal. Among the tourist attractions around the tree-lined Plaza Mayor (main square) are:
Portón de Campo – the City Gate and wooden drawbridge
Lighthouse and convent ruins of the 17th-century Convent of San Francisco
Basílica del Santísimo Sacramento – the Basilica of the Holy Sacrament, built of stone by the Portuguese in 1808
Portuguese Museum – constructed in the 18th century, it exhibits Portuguese furnishings, jewelry, uniforms and old maps of Portuguese naval expeditions
Casa de Nacarello – an 18th-century Portuguese house
Municipal Museum – rebuilt by the Spanish in 1835 as the Casa del Almirante Brown, it exhibits artifacts and documents of the city's different periods and cultures
Viceroy's House – the Casa del Virrey, reconstructed from the original ruins
 Plaza de toros Real de San Carlos, a Bullring included in an old tourist complex now abandoned.

Gallery

Transportation
Colonia del Sacramento is served by three ferry boat lines from Buenos Aires, Argentina: "Buquebus", "Seacat Colonia" and "Colonia Express".

Two principal highways end in Colonia: Route 1 connects Colonia to Montevideo and points east; Route 21 connects to points north, including the Aarón de Anchorena National Park,  distant, and Fray Bentos. There is also a local airport for small planes. There is a project in process to lengthen the runway and begin commercial flights to Buenos Aires (this was done in the past) and other cities within Uruguay.

Consular representation
Argentina and Portugal both maintain a consulate in Colonia del Sacramento.

Twin towns – sister cities
 Antigua Guatemala, Guatemala
 Guimarães, Portugal
 Morón, Argentina
 Olinda, Brazil
 Pelotas, Brazil
 Quilmes, Argentina

See also
 List of diplomatic missions in Uruguay#Consulate in Colonia del Sacramento

Bibliography
  (with prologue by Federico Mayor Zaragoza and introduction by Marta Canessa de Sanguinetti)

References

External links

Article on Colonia del Sacramento, Official Portal of the Uruguayan Government 
360° Virtual Tours of Colonia del Sacramento - Uruguay360.com.uy
Tourist information about Colonia del Sacramento
Tourist guide about Colonia del Sacramento – photos, hosting and attractions of Colonia del Sacramento attractions
Colonia del Sacramento Website
INE map of Colonia del Sacramento

 
Populated places in the Colonia Department
Port cities and towns in Uruguay
Río de la Plata
Colonial Uruguay
Former Portuguese colonies
Portuguese colonization of the Americas
Populated places established in 1680
1680 establishments in Uruguay
1680 establishments in the Portuguese Empire
Portugal–Spain relations
Tourism in Uruguay
World Heritage Sites in Uruguay

Empire